Colony is an unincorporated community in Knox County, in the U.S. state of Missouri. It is situated on in Colony Township, at the K&V junction.

History
Colony was originally called Kentucky Colony, and under the latter name settlement was made in the early 1840s by some of the first settlers in the county, a group of four or five pioneer families from Kentucky, about two miles northeast of the present site of Colony. A post office called Colony was established in 1848, and remained in operation until 1907.

References

Unincorporated communities in Knox County, Missouri
Unincorporated communities in Missouri